Susie Wind (born 1968 in Wichita, Kansas) is a visual artist specializing in oils and chalk paintings. She is active in the Seattle arts community but has participated in showings across the United States.

Wind received a bachelor's degree in Fine Arts from the University of Utah in 1995 and a master's degree in Art Therapy from College of Notre Dame in Belmont, California in 1997. She is married to Professional Engineer Lloyd Wind.  They had two children.

Wind specializes in "Urban Settings", a subset of American Scene Painting, a generalized series of vignettes attempting to capture the unknown stories of previous inhabitants of the spaces we now inhabit.  She has been featured in showings at Salt Lake City Library and several other civic and municipal settings, as well as many gallery shows.

Solo shows
June 2017 "Inner Dialogue" Fountainhead Gallery, Seattle WA
January 2016  "Snapshots of Appreciation"  Fountainhead Gallery
2013  Fountainhead Gallery
2010  Fountainhead Gallery
2008  Fountainhead Gallery
2007  Fountainhead Gallery
2007  Mountlake Terrace Library, Mountlake Terrace WA
2006  Virginia Inn, Seattle WA
2006  Lynnwood Library, Lynnwood WA
2006  Old Redmond Schoolhouse, Redmond WA
2006  Wade James Theatre, Edmonds WA
2005  Harbor Steps, Seattle WA
2005  Click Wine Gallery, Seattle WA
2005  Shoreline Arts Council Gallery, Shoreline WA
2004  Blue Door Gallery, Seattle WA
2004  Kent City Arts Gallery, Kent WA
2003  Gallery North, Edmonds WA
2003  Blue Door Gallery, Seattle WA
2003  Site 17, Seattle WA
2003  Ida Culver House, Seattle WA
2002  Virginia Inn, Seattle WA
2002  Gilmartin Gallery U.U.C., Seattle WA
2001  Genesis Salon, Seattle WA
1999  Sun Light Cafe, Seattle WA
1999  Still Life Coffeehouse, Seattle WA
1997  Torrefazzione, Palo Alto CA
1996  Atrium Gallery, Salt Lake City UT
1995  Galleria Meditarreano, Salt Lake City UT

Group exhibitions
2006  38th Annual International Juried, Palm Springs CA
2006  Fountainhead Gallery, Seattle WA
2006  Greenwood Artwalk, Seattle WA
2004  Kaewyn Gallery, Bothell WA
2004  Northwest Annual Juried, Seattle WA
2004  Greenwood Artwalk, Seattle WA
2003  Eastshore Gallery, Bellevue WA
2003  Greenwood Artwalk, Seattle WA
2003  Ocean Shores National Juried, Ocean Shores WA
2003  National Women's Juried, Boise ID
2002  Northwest Artists Annual, Edmonds WA
2002  Northwest Annual Juried, Seattle WA
2002  Gallery North, Edmonds WA
2002  Greenwood Artwalk, Seattle WA
2001  F.A.C.E. Edmonds City Hall, Edmonds WA
2001  Greenwood Artwalk, Seattle WA
2000  Howard Mandeville Gallery, Edmonds WA
1999  F.A.C.E Gallery, Lynnwood WA
1997  Graduating Master's Exhibit, Belmont CA
1997  Annual California Art Therapy Exhibit, Belmont CA
1994  Salt Lake City Arts Counctil Annual Exhibit, Salt Lake City UT

Awards
2004  Second Place, Northwest Annual Juried Competition, Seattle WA
2004  People's Choice, Greenwood Artwalk, Seattle WA
2003  First Place (Painting), Ocean Shores Annual National, Ocean Shores WA
2002  First Place, Regional Painting Competition, Bothell WA

References

 the Stranger (Seattle weekly newspaper) website
 Redmond City website
 Lynnwood City website
 Seattle Weekly newspaper website
 Center of Contemporary Art website
 Red Step Gallery website
 Driftwood Players website
 Edmonds Art Studio Tour website
 Art Facts Net website
 Northlake Unitarian Universalist Church website
 Kent City website
 City of Lake Forest Park website
 Seattle Artists Com website
 Enterprise Newspapers website
 Artdish Com website
 Eventective (event locator) website
 Greenwood Phinney Artwalk website

University of Utah alumni
1968 births
Living people
Notre Dame de Namur University alumni
Artists from Wichita, Kansas